Chitrangada is a 2017 Telugu-language horror film directed by Ashok G. It stars Anjali, Sakshi Gulati and Saptagiri.

Synopsis 
Chitra, a college professor, loses her sanity after a series of traumatising experiences and is ostracised for her unpredictable behaviour. In the hope of finding a solution to her problems, she decides to go to the United States. There, she finds the place where she dreamt and starts investigating about her dream and murder and discovers that Ravi Verma, who had died, was reborn as Chitra.

Cast

Anjali as Chitrangada
Sakshi Gulati as Samyukta
Saptagiri as Punjuko Babban
Rajsekhar Aningi as Mantrikudu 
Jayaprakash as Chitrangada's psychologist
Deepak as Ravivarma
Swathi Deekshith
Raja Ravindra
Sindhu Tolani
Sudigali Sudheer as Kanakambaram

Soundtrack

Reviews

Times of India gave 2.5 out of 5 stars concluding Chitrangada might be a decent one-time watch. Indiaglitz gave 2.5 praising the second half of the film.

References

External links 
 

2010s Telugu-language films
Indian horror thriller films
2017 horror films